No'man Ashour (January 1918 – 5 April 1987) was an Egyptian poet and playwright, born in Mit Ghamr, Dakahlia Governorate. He is most known for the foundation of realism in the Egyptian drama. Moreover he considered comedy as the best medium to reflect reality, even if it is painful and serious.

Plays
List of plays that Ashour wrote:

The Magnet – 1955
Time Game – 1980
Secret of the Universe – 1970
The Grinding Mill
Al-Doghri Family
Three Nights
Countries Afar – 1976
People Upstairs

References

External links
No'man Ashour on Egyptian State Information Service

Egyptian male poets
Egyptian dramatists and playwrights
1918 births
1987 deaths
20th-century Egyptian poets
20th-century dramatists and playwrights
20th-century male writers